The Expeditionary Tank was a light tank developed in the 1980s by Teledyne Vehicle Systems, for the US Army's Armored Gun System (AGS) competition. It is sometimes known as the Teledyne light tank. (The name TCM-20, which has sometimes been applied to this vehicle, strictly speaking refers only to its gun system.)

Development

In the late 1970s, Teledyne Vehicle Systems carried out several studies on a highly mobile light tracked vehicle, which could be used for a variety of tasks. The in-house trials lasted from 1980 to 1981. In 1982, a detailed design had been decided on. This vehicle competed in the Armored Gun System (AGS) competition. The first prototype hull was completed in December 1983, and the turret was completed mid-1984. In October, testing took place in the Nevada test center on mobility and reliability, and in April 1985, the chassis and turret were united. A month later, the vehicle was presented for the first time at the U.S. Army Armor Conference at Fort Knox. In 1986 test firing took place. In 1992, the Expeditionary Tank lost out in the AGS competition to United Defense's Close Combat Vehicle, Light, which was type classified as the M8 Armored Gun System. The Expeditionary Tank was later offered to other nations by Teledyne and later General Dynamics, but was never bought.

Design
The tank would have been transported by a Lockheed C-130 Hercules or Lockheed C-141 Starlifter. To ensure a high level of protection despite the low weight of the front end of the vehicle there was an armored crew chamber, behind which the drive block was placed. The vehicle was operated by a three-man crew, all positioned in the hull. The driver sits at the front left. The tank was to be equipped with a double bottom to better the survivability from mines.

The turret developed for this vehicle is used on the M1128 Mobile Gun System. The autoloader was problematic and required a redesign.

References 

Cold War tanks of the United States
Light tanks of the United States
Light tanks of the Cold War
Trial and research tanks of the United States